Jean Burelle (born 1938/39) is a French billionaire, the chairman and CEO of the family-owned company Burelle.

Early life
He is the son of Pierre Burelle, the founder of Burelle. He has a bachelor's degree from ETH Zurich, and an MBA from Harvard Business School.

Career
He and his brother Laurent control 77% of Burelle.

Personal life
Burelle is married, and lives in Paris.

References

1930s births
Living people
French billionaires
Harvard Business School alumni
ETH Zurich alumni
Businesspeople from Paris